George Markarian, is a former Iranian football player. He played for Iran national football team in 1951 Asian Games As captain of the national team he led the 1951 Iranian squad to a silver medal in the Asia Olympic Games (Asian Cup). He was also the premier center forward for the top club team in Iran called Taj. This team annually finished number one in the Iranian league while he was a member. He played alongside other Iranian greats like Khatemi, Boyuk Jedikar, and Mahmoud Bayati.

Club career
He previously played for Docharkheh Savaran and Taj until 1952.

Honours
Iran
Asian Games Silver medal: 1951

References

External links

 George Markaryan at TeamMelli.com

Iranian footballers
Ethnic Armenian sportspeople
Iranian people of Armenian descent
Esteghlal F.C. players
Living people
Asian Games silver medalists for Iran
Asian Games medalists in football
Footballers at the 1951 Asian Games
Medalists at the 1951 Asian Games
Association football defenders
Year of birth missing (living people)
Iran international footballers